Arts Garden is a floral garden in Sé, Macau, China. It runs along Avenida de Amizade and bisects two other parks, Comendador Ho Yin Garden and Dr Carlos d'Assumpcao Park.

The park features:
 Floral gardens
 Fountains
 Statuary

See also
 List of tourist attractions in Macau

References

Sé, Macau
Gardens in Macau